Guajará-Mirim is a municipality in the Brazilian state of Rondônia. It is located at an altitude of 128 meters. Its population was 46,556 (2020) and its area is 24,856 km².

Location

Guajará-Mirim lies along the Mamoré River, just across the Bolivian border town of Guayaramerín. It was once the southern terminus of the Estrada de Ferro Madeira-Mamoré (the Madeira-Mamoré Railway), which was inaugurated in 1912.  It is the seat of the Roman Catholic Diocese of Guajará-Mirim.

Conservation

The municipality contains the  Traçadal Biological Reserve, a strictly protected area that was created in 1990.
It contains 2.33% of the  Guajará-Mirim State Park, created in 1990.
It contains the  Rio Ouro Preto Biological Reserve, created in 1990.
It contains 73.45% of the  Rio Ouro Preto Extractive Reserve, also created in 1990.
The municipality contains 47.5% of the  Rio Cautário State Extractive Reserve, created in 1995.
It contains the  Rio Cautário Federal Extractive Reserve, created in 2001.

References

Sources

Municipalities in Rondônia